Step Up 2: The Streets is a 2008 American dance drama film directed by Jon M. Chu (in his feature film directorial debut) and written by Toni Ann Johnson and Karen Barna. It serves as a sequel to 2006's Step Up and the second installment in the Step Up film series. The film stars Briana Evigan, Robert Hoffman, Will Kemp, and Cassie Ventura.

Set at the fictional Maryland School of the Arts, the story revolves around rebellious street dancer Andie West (Evigan) who lands at the elite school and finds herself fighting to fit in while also trying to hold onto her old life. She eventually joins forces with the school's hottest dancer Chase Collins (Hoffman) to form a crew of classmate outcasts to compete in Baltimore's underground dance battle The Streets, finding a way to live her dream while building a bridge between her two separate worlds.

Step Up 2: The Streets was released in the United States on February 14, 2008, by Walt Disney Studios Motion Pictures. Although the film received better reviews than its predecessor, it received mostly negative reviews from critics, but became a box office success, grossing $150.8 million worldwide against a budget of $17.5 million.

A sequel, Step Up 3D, was released on August 6, 2010, in the United States.

Plot
In Baltimore, Maryland, Andie West pursues her dream of becoming a street dancer, but feels like she does not belong anywhere. Her mother recently died of cancer, so she now lives with a guardian, her mother's best friend Sarah. She is doing poorly at school, but her passion for dancing brings something good into her life. She rehearses regularly with her "crew", the 410, to retain top ranking in the illegal competition "The Streets".

Andie's friend and older brother figure Tyler Gage persuades her to audition for the Maryland School of the Arts, hoping it will help turn her life around the same way it did him in the first film. Andie auditions and Chase Collins convinces his older brother Blake, the school's director, to let her join. When the 410 find out about Andie's studies, they angrily kick her out. Andie and Chase form a new crew with help from many people Chase knows at the school who are not accepted as who they are. Chase has a copied key to the studio and the crew secretly practices their routine late at night when the school is empty. Missy, Andie's friend, joins the crew after dropping out of the 410 following Andie's removal. Missy tells the crew that the only way to enter the streets is to first do a prank and post it on the internet to show that the crew is entering the competition. Wanting revenge from being humiliated before, Chase decides to make a fool out of Tuck, leader of the 410, by leaving a dead fish in the vent of Tuck's home.

But the 410 doesn't like the fact that they had a new crew to compete with so they warn Andie's new crew to stay out of the Streets or there will be consequences. When Tuck finds Chase, he assaults him because of his prank. Chase comes into school the next day badly bruised and hurt. On top of that the dance studio has been trashed by the 410 late at night. Director Collins forbids the school from being involved in these types of competitions and expels Andie from MSA because of her involvement with the Streets competition; Andie proclaims herself the sole participant to protect her teammates. Chase attempts to defend her, but Director Collins is too busy with an upcoming MSA fundraiser to let her back in.

When Andie's guardian hears the news of Andie's expulsion, she becomes fed up with Andie's behavior and decides to send her to live with her aunt in Texas. Later that night, Andie receives a text message that the Streets is on that night, the same night as the MSA fundraiser. Along with Andie, her whole crew gets the text message. They decide to ditch the MSA fundraiser, and instead compete at the Streets. Andie's guardian hears about what Andie did to protect her crew and is proud of her; she reconsiders sending Andie to Texas and allows her to compete at the Streets with her crew.

When Director Collins goes in search of his students, he ends up at the Streets as well. He sees them compete and realizes that the street dancing he has been opposing is in fact a legitimate form of artistic expression. He accepts Andie back into MSA. With Andie's crew as a group of friends supporting her and her education now being secured, the film finds its optimistic ending.

Cast
 Briana Evigan as Andrea "Andie" West, the main protagonist. Andie is a talented street dancer. Andie has felt out of place ever since her mother died from cancer. Andie's father died prior to the movie. Andie gets poor grades in school as she doesn't care about education. 
 Robert Hoffman as Chase Collins, Blake's younger brother who falls in love with Andie 
 Adam Sevani as Robert "Moose" Alexander III, is a talented dancer who is Andie and Missy's best friend
 Will Kemp as Blake Collins, the strict director of MSA and Chase's older brother
 Cassie Ventura as Sophie Donovan, Chase's ex-girlfriend who later falls in love with Moose
 Christopher Scott as Hair, a talented choreographer 
 Harry Shum, Jr. as Cable
 Janelle Cambridge as Fly
 LaJon Dantzler as Smiles
 Luis Rosado as Monster
 Mari Koda as Jenny Kido
 Sonja Sohn as Sarah, Andie's overprotective legal guardian. She took Andie in after her mother died. Sarah is concerned about Andie's safety and plans to send her to Texas to live with her Aunt Alice. Before Andie's mother died Sarah promised her best friend that she'd protect her daughter. Sarah intends to keep her promise. Sarah believes that the only way to protect Andie is to send her to Texas. Sarah wants Andie to be safe and get good grades.
 Black Thomas as Tucker "Tuck", the leader of the 410 and the main antagonist
 Telisha Shaw as Felicia, Andie's best friend who eventually turns on her & sells her out to Tuck for dancing at MSA.
 Danielle Polanco as Melissa "Missy" Serrano, Andie and Moose's best friend who eventually quits 410
 Channing Tatum as Tyler Gage (cameo), protagonist from the first film. A skilled but troubled dancer in his teens who turned his life around at MSA and now is touring as a professional dancer with Nora.
 Rockstar Logu as Mike (cameo), Indian artist
 BooG!e as DJ Sand (uncredited)
 Jenny Kressebuch as Store Clerk
Ariana Glover and Chad Glover as the two youngest kids in the cast background dancers (#7 and #2). The cast really bonded and loved these adorable talented kids.

Reception

Box office
At the U.S. Box office, the film opened at #3 and earned $18,908,826 in its opening weekend. As of August 4, 2008, Step Up 2: The Streets have grossed $58,017,783 in domestic box office and $92,798,917 in other parts of the world, bringing a worldwide total of $150,816,700, outperforming its predecessor.

Critical response
 
The film was met with negative reviews from critics. On Rotten Tomatoes, it has an approval rating of 28% based on reviews from 65 critics, with an average rating of 4.90/10. The website's consensus states "There's a kinetic appeal to the handsome cast and their smooth moves, but everything else about Step Up 2: The Streets is been there, danced that." On Metacritic it has a weighted average score of 50 out of 100 based on reviews from 20 critics, indicating "mixed or average reviews". Audiences polled by CinemaScore gave the film a grade A−.

Accolades
 Teen Choice Award for Choice Movie: Drama (winner)
 Teen Choice Award for Choice Movie Breakout Female (Briana Evigan, nominee)
 MTV Movie Award for Best Kiss (Briana Evigan and Robert Hoffman, winner)
 Imagen Foundation Awards for Best Supporting Actress (Danielle Polanco, nominee)

Home media
The film was released on DVD and Blu-ray on July 15, 2008.

 Special features
 Through Fresh Eyes – The Making of Step Up 2
 Outlaws Of Hip-Hop – Meet The "410"
 Lead Actor Robert Hoffman Video Prank
 Outtakes From Step Up 2: The Streets – Cassie Performs "Is It You"
 Deleted Scenes – Including Dances By JabbaWockeeZ And West Coast Riders Dance Crews
 Music Videos
 Flo Rida feat. T-Pain - "Low"
 Missy Elliott - "Ching-a-Ling/Shake Your Pom Pom"
 Cherish feat. Yung Joc - "Killa"
 Plies feat. Akon - "Hypnotized"
 Brit & Alex - "Let It Go"

Soundtrack

A soundtrack album to the film was released by Atlantic Records on February 5, 2008.

References

External links

 
 
 
 

2008 romantic drama films
2008 films
American dance films
American musical drama films
American romantic drama films
American romantic musical films
American teen drama films
American teen romance films
2000s English-language films
Films about dance competitions
Films directed by Jon M. Chu
Films scored by Aaron Zigman
Films set in Baltimore
Films shot in Baltimore
2000s hip hop films
American sequel films
Step Up (film series)
Summit Entertainment films
Touchstone Pictures films
Universal Pictures films
2008 directorial debut films
2000s American films